Robustness is the property of being strong and healthy in constitution.

Robustness may also refer to:

Science

Biology
Robustness (evolution), the persistence of a system’s characteristics after perturbation (includes mutational robustness and environmental robustness)
Robustness (morphology), body types based on strength and a heavy build

Other sciences
 Structural robustness, the strength of a structure to withstand calamities like earthquakes, tornados, etc.
 Robustness (computer science), the ability of a computer system to cope with errors during execution
 Robust statistics, a statistical technique that performs well even if its assumptions are somewhat violated by the true model from which the data were generated
 Robust optimization, a field of mathematical optimization theory
Robust fuzzy programming, a mathematical optimization approach to deal with optimization problems under uncertainty
 Robustness (economics), the ability of a financial trading system to remain effective under different markets

Other uses
 Robust decision making, an iterative decision analytics framework that aims to help identify potential robust strategies
 Robust control, an approach to controller design that explicitly deals with uncertainty
 'Robust', a 6-row barley variety